In the mythology of Kiribati, Auriaria is a red haired giant chieftain who fell in love with the beautiful red-haired woman, Nei Tituaabine, but had no children. She died and, from her grave grew three trees—a coconut from her head, a pandanus from her heels and an almond from her navel.  She became a tree goddess.

Kiribati mythology